Edward P. Murray (April 7, 1876 – January 22, 1966) was a justice on the Maine Supreme Judicial Court, from September 18, 1947, to April 6, 1948. He was a Roman Catholic, and his great nephews include Fr. Frank J. Murray and Robert Murray.

A resident of Bangor, Maine, Murray was appointed to the court by Governor Horace Hildreth, and served until his retirement. Upon his death, the Maine Legislature noted that he had been an active member of the legal profession in Maine for over 64 years, and described him as "famed for his legal ability and courtroom wit".

References

Justices of the Maine Supreme Judicial Court
American Catholics
1876 births
1966 deaths
People from Bangor, Maine